Alun Jones was the defending champion, but he chose to not participate this year.
Brydan Klein won in the final 6–3, 6–3, against Grega Žemlja.

Seeds

Draw

Final four

Top half

Bottom half

Sources
 Main Draw

External links
 Qualifying Draw

McDonald's Burnie International - Singles
2009 in Australian tennis
2009 Singles